Olatunji Oluwasehun Akinola (born 21 November 1998) is an English professional footballer who plays as a defender, most recently for Scottish Championship side Partick Thistle.

Career

West Ham United 
Akinola first played for Brimsdown Rovers in north London, at around aged seven or eight, before joining West Ham United as a nine-year old.

Akinola was promoted to the under-18 squad at the age of 15, made over 50 appearances at under-23 level and who made his maiden first-team appearance in a pre-season win over Wycombe Wanderers in August 2020. He played in the EFL Trophy against Colchester United in September 2020. His departure from West Ham at the end of June 2021 was announced on 4 June 2021.

Leyton Orient 
Akinola signed for Leyton Orient on loan from West Ham United in October 2020. He made his debut against Barrow on 10 October 2020.

Partick Thistle 
In August 2021, Akinola signed a one-year deal with Scottish Championship club Partick Thistle. Akinola scored the first professional goal of his career, opening the scoring as Thistle won 2–0 away to Stranraer in the Scottish Challenge Cup.

Akinola signed a one year contract extension with Thistle in January 2022. On 25 January 2023, Akinola left Partick by mutual consent.

Style of play
During his time at the club, West Ham described Akinola as "tall and composed" and a "ball-playing" centre-back.

Personal life
Akinola is of Nigerian descent.

Career statistics

References

External links

1998 births
Living people
English footballers
Association football defenders
Leyton Orient F.C. players
West Ham United F.C. players
English Football League players
Black British sportspeople
Brimsdown Rovers F.C. players
English sportspeople of Nigerian descent
Partick Thistle F.C. players
Scottish Professional Football League players